Shuhai Xiao (born 1967, China) is a Chinese-American paleontologist and professor of geobiology at Virginia Tech, Blacksburg, Virginia, U.S.A.

Early life
Xiao attended Taihe Middle School in Jiangxi Province, China. He received a B.Sc. degree and an M.Sc. degree from Peking University in 1988 and 1991, both in geology. He then worked as an assistant researcher in the Nanjing Institute of Geology and Palaeontology, Chinese Academy of Sciences, for two years. He earned a Ph.D. degree in Organismic and Evolutionary Biology from Harvard University in 1998.

Career
Xiao worked as a Postdoctoral Fellow at Harvard University in 1998–2000 and an Assistant Professor in the Department of Geology at Tulane University in 2000–2003. In 2003, he moved to Virginia Tech, serving as an Assistant Professor (2003–2005), Associate Professor (2005–2008), and Full Professor (2008–present) in the department of Geosciences. From 2012 to 2020, Xiao served as the chair of the Subcommission on Ediacaran Stratigraphy, International Commission on Stratigraphy.

Research
Xiao studies the interactions between the biosphere and its environment during key transition periods in Earth's history, particularly the Ediacaran-Cambrian transition. He has published extensively on Ediacaran stratigraphy and paleobiology in South China, particularly the Doushantuo, Lantian, and Dengying formations. He is interested in Precambrian microbial world, the fossil record of eukaryotes, multicellular algae, the Ediacara biota, the early evolution of animals, and exceptional fossil preservation.

Awards and honors
2021 NAS Award in the Evolution of Earth and Life - Mary Clark Thompson Medal
2019 Fellow, American Association for the Advancement of Science (AAAS)
2019 Patricia Caldwell Faculty Fellow, College of Science, Virginia Tech
2017 Virginia Outstanding Scientist Award
2016 Visiting Scholarship, Phi Beta Kappa Society
2015 Fellow, Geological Society of America
2010 Guggenheim Fellowship
2010 Virginia Tech Alumni Award for Excellence in Research
2007 Fellow, Paleontological Society
2006 Paleontological Society Charles Schuchert Award

Xiao's graduate students and post-docs also received plenty of awards which can be found on the webpage of Xiao's research group.

References 

1967 births
Living people
Chinese academics
Peking University alumni
Harvard University alumni
Tulane University faculty
Virginia Tech faculty